Port Darwin is an electoral division of the Legislative Assembly in the Northern Territory of Australia. It was first created in 1974, and is an entirely urban electorate, covering only 5 km² and taking in the Darwin central business district, as well as the suburb of Larrakeyah and part of Stuart Park. There were 5,699 people enrolled in the electorate as of August 2020.

Unlike most state and territory electorates based on CBDs, Port Darwin historically tilted conservative. For most of the first four decades of its existence, Port Darwin was a safe seat for the Country Liberal Party, although it was one of only two seats the party did not hold in the first parliament from 1974 to 1977. It was widely considered as CLP heartland, and was their safest seat in Darwin for many years. The strength of the CLP vote in the seat was seen at the 2000 by-election caused by the resignation of controversial former Chief Minister Shane Stone, when a struggling CLP still managed to easily fend off any challenge in the seat.

After the Labor Party victory at the 2001 election, it became the only CLP-held seat west of Palmerston, and the only CLP seat in the capital.  As a result, there were very few signs in the lead-up to the 2005 election that sitting member Sue Carter was in danger, with most commentators expecting her to win another term. However, on election day, there was a surprise significant and unprecedented swing to the ALP across the Territory. Though the result was so close that it was not known for several days after the election, Carter was ultimately defeated by Labor opponent Kerry Sacilotto by 73 votes.  Sacilotto actually won just enough primary votes to take the seat without the need for preferences.  She held the seat for only one term, until when John Elferink regained the seat for the CLP at the 2008 election.

Elferink seemingly consolidated his hold on the seat in 2012.  However, he retired ahead of the 2016 election.  At that election, the CLP lost over 12.9 percent of its primary vote amid its collapse in the Darwin/Palmerston area, allowing Paul Kirby to become only the second Labor member to win it. Kirby successfully retained the seat four years later.

Members for Port Darwin

Election results

References

External links
 Division profile from the Northern Territory Electoral Commission

Port Darwin
History of Darwin, Northern Territory